The Perryman Generating Station is a 353 MW electric generating peaking power plant owned by Constellation Energy, located in Baltimore, Maryland. Perryman has five units; four are oil-fired, and one is natural gas-fired.

See also
List of power stations in Maryland

References

Buildings and structures in Baltimore
Exelon
Oil-fired power stations in Maryland
Natural gas-fired power stations in Maryland